Lenting is a municipality in the district of Eichstätt in Bavaria in Germany.

Mayors 
The mayor is since April 2012 Christian Tauer (SPD):

References

Eichstätt (district)